WHMH-FM (101.7 MHz) is a commercial radio station in Sauk Rapids, Minnesota, broadcasting an active rock radio format. The station is owned by Tri-County Broadcasting, calling itself "Rockin' 101" and commonly referred to as "The Red House". Its main competitor is KXXR "93X".

WHMH-FM has an effective radiated power (ERP) of 40,000 watts.  The transmitter is on 2nd Street North at Summit Avenue South in Sauk Rapids, directly behind the studios.

HD Radio
, WHMH-FM broadcasts using HD Radio technology. Its HD2 digital subchannel carries its classic rock sister station WXYG ("Album Rock 540"), while its HD3 subchannel carries an alternative rock format known as "106point5."  That signal feeds FM translator 106.5 W293CS.  The HD3 subchannel formerly carried its country music sister station WVAL ("800 WVAL"). The HD4 subchannel carries adult standards sister station WMIN ("Uptown 10-10").

History
In October 1975, the station first signed on the air.  Its tower was previously co-located with KLZZ on the south side of St. Cloud, near the Interstate 94 interchange.

Controversy
On November 24, 2020, WHMH morning host Aaron Imholte spent the majority of his show joking about KAZR morning host Heather Lee.

On November 25, 2020, Aaron Imholte resigned, taking the trademarked Steel Toe Morning Show with him to Twitch.tv.

WHMH's current wake up program is The Johnny Rock Show.

References

External links
Rockin' 101 WHMH-FM official website

Radio stations in St. Cloud, Minnesota
Active rock radio stations in the United States